Mathew Joseph Conniff (8 February 1877 – 18 February 1962) was an Australian rules footballer who played with St Kilda in the Victorian Football League (VFL).

References

External links 

1877 births
1962 deaths
Australian rules footballers from Victoria (Australia)
Australian military personnel of World War I
St Kilda Football Club players